The 2013 French Road Cycling Cup was the 22nd edition of the French Road Cycling Cup.

Compared to the previous edition, the Flèche d'Emeraude was replaced by the Tour de la Somme. The defending champion from 2012 was Samuel Dumoulin, who won for a second consecutive time after a third place in the final event allowed him to overtake Bryan Coquard and Anthony Geslin in the overall standings. Bryan Coquard still won the youth classification, while  won the teams competition.

Events

Points standings

Individual
In order to be eligible for the classification, riders either had to be French or competed for a French-licensed team.

Young rider classification
In order to be eligible for the classification, riders had to be younger than 25 and either had to be French or competed for a French-licensed team.

Teams
Only French teams are eligible to be classified in the teams classification.

External links
  Official website

French Road Cycling Cup
French Road Cycling Cup
2013 in French sport